In functional analysis and quantum measurement theory, a positive operator-valued measure (POVM) is a measure whose values are positive semi-definite operators on a Hilbert space. POVMs are a generalisation of projection-valued measures (PVM) and, correspondingly, quantum measurements described by POVMs are a generalisation of quantum measurement described by PVMs (called projective measurements). 

In rough analogy, a POVM is to a PVM what a mixed state is to a pure state. Mixed states are needed to specify the state of a subsystem of a larger system (see purification of quantum state); analogously, POVMs are necessary to describe the effect on a subsystem of a projective measurement performed on a larger system.

POVMs are the most general kind of measurement in quantum mechanics, and can also be used in quantum field theory. They are extensively used in the field of quantum information.

Definition 
In the simplest case, of a POVM with a finite number of elements acting on a finite-dimensional Hilbert space, a POVM is a set of positive semi-definite Hermitian matrices  on a Hilbert space  that sum to the identity matrix,

In quantum mechanics, the POVM element  is associated with the measurement outcome , such that the probability of obtaining it when making a measurement on the quantum state  is given by

,

where  is the trace operator. When the quantum state being measured is a pure state  this formula reduces to 

.

The simplest case of a POVM generalises the simplest case of a PVM, which is a set of orthogonal projectors  that sum to the identity matrix:

The probability formulas for a PVM are the same as for the POVM. An important difference is that the elements of a POVM are not necessarily orthogonal. As a consequence, the number of elements  of the POVM can be larger than the dimension of the Hilbert space they act in. On the other hand, the number of elements  of the PVM is at most the dimension of the Hilbert space.

In general, POVMs can also be defined in situations where the number of elements and the dimension of the Hilbert space is not finite:

Definition. A POVM is a function  defined on  whose values are bounded non-negative self-adjoint operators on a Hilbert space  such that  and for every ,

is a non-negative countably additive measure on the σ-algebra .

Its key property is that it determines a probability measure on the outcome space, so that  can be interpreted as the probability (density) of outcome  when making a measurement on the quantum state .

Naimark's dilation theorem 

Note: An alternate spelling of this is "Neumark's Theorem"

Naimark's dilation theorem shows how POVMs can be obtained from PVMs acting on a larger space. This result is of critical importance in quantum mechanics, as it gives a way to physically realize POVM measurements.

In the simplest case, of a POVM with a finite number of elements acting on a finite-dimensional Hilbert space, Naimark's theorem says that if  is a POVM acting on a Hilbert space  of dimension , then there exists a PVM  acting on a Hilbert space  of dimension  and an isometry  such that for all ,

The probability of obtaining outcome  with this PVM, and the state suitably transformed by the isometry, is the same as the probability of obtaining it with the original POVM:

This construction can be turned into a recipe for a physical realisation of the POVM by extending the isometry  into a unitary , that is, finding  such that

This can always be done.

This is not the minimum possible, as a more complicated construction gives  for rank-1 POVMs.

Post-measurement state 
The post-measurement state is not determined by the POVM itself, but rather by the PVM that physically realizes it. Since there are infinitely many different PVMs that realize the same POVM, the operators  alone do not determine what the post-measurement state will be. To see that, note that for any unitary  the operators

will also have the property that , so that using the isometry

in the above construction will also implement the same POVM. In the case where the state being measured is in a pure state , the resulting unitary  takes it together with the ancilla to state

and the projective measurement on the ancilla will collapse  to the state

on obtaining result . When the state being measured is described by a density matrix , the corresponding post-measurement state is given by
.
We see therefore that the post-measurement state depends explicitly on the unitary . Note that while  is always Hermitian, generally,  does not have to be Hermitian.

Another difference from the projective measurements is that a POVM measurement is in general not repeatable. If on the first measurement result  was obtained, the probability of obtaining a different result  on a second measurement is

,
In a projective measurement these operators are always orthogonal and therefore the measurement is always repeatable.

An example: unambiguous quantum state discrimination 

Suppose you have a quantum system with a 2-dimensional Hilbert space that you know is in either the state  or the state , and you want to determine which one it is. The impossibility of perfectly discriminating between non-orthogonal states is the basis for quantum information protocols such as quantum cryptography, quantum coin flipping, and quantum money.

It is possible to do this with projective measurements.

The POVM that gives the highest probability of a conclusive outcome in this task is given by 

The probability of having a conclusive outcome is given by

This result is known as the Ivanovic-Dieks-Peres limit, named after the authors who pioneered UQSD research.

Using the above construction we can obtain a projective measurement that physically realises this POVM. The square roots of the POVM elements are given by 

where

and similarly it takes the state  together with the ancilla to

A measurement on the ancilla then gives the desired results with the same probabilities as the POVM.

This POVM has been used to experimentally distinguish non-orthogonal polarisation states of a photon, using the path degree of freedom as an ancilla. The realisation of the POVM with a projective measurement was slightly different from the one described here.

See also 
SIC-POVM
Quantum measurement
Mathematical formulation of quantum mechanics
Density matrix
Quantum operation
Projection-valued measure
Vector measure

References 

POVMs
K. Kraus, States, Effects, and Operations, Lecture Notes in Physics 190, Springer (1983).
E.B.Davies, Quantum Theory of Open Systems, Academic Press (1976).
A.S. Holevo, Probabilistic and statistical aspects of quantum theory, North-Holland Publ. Cy., Amsterdam (1982).

External links

 Interactive demonstration about quantum state discrimination

Quantum information theory
Quantum measurement